Csaba Kuzma (born November 20, 1954, in Tatabánya, Komárom-Esztergom) is a retired male light-heavyweight boxer from Hungary, who represented his native country at the 1980 Summer Olympics in Moscow, Soviet Union. There he was eliminated in the first round by Denmark's Michael Madsen on points (2-3).

References
 sports-reference

1954 births
Living people
Light-heavyweight boxers
Boxers at the 1980 Summer Olympics
Olympic boxers of Hungary
People from Tatabánya
Hungarian male boxers
Sportspeople from Komárom-Esztergom County